Eva Menasse (born 11 May 1970 in Vienna) is an Austrian author and journalist.  She has studied history and German literature. Menasse had a successful career as a journalist, writing for the Frankfurter Allgemeine Zeitung in Frankfurt and as a correspondent from Prague and Berlin. She left the paper to write her first novel, Vienna, and now lives and works in Berlin as a freelance author.

In 2005, she received the Corine Literature Prize. The English translation of her novel Vienna was shortlisted for the 2007 Independent Foreign Fiction Prize in the UK.

Menasse was married to the German author Michael Kumpfmüller from 2004 to 2017.

Awards
 2013 Heinrich-Böll-Preis
 2015 Villa Massimo Scholarship in Rome
 2015 Jonathan-Swift-Preis
 2017 Friedrich-Hölderlin-Preis
 2017 Österreichischer Buchpreis
 2019 Ludwig Börne Prize
 2019 Mainzer Stadtschreiber
 2023 Jakob-Wassermann-Literaturpreis

Works
 Die letzte Märchenprinzessin, (with Elisabeth and Robert Menasse), 1997
 Klein Menasses der mächtigste Mann, (with Elisabeth and Robert Menasse), 1998
 Der Holocaust vor Gericht. Der Prozess um David Irving, 2000
 Vienna, novel, 2005 (English: Vienna, translated by Anthea Bell, 2006)
 Lässliche Todsünden, short stories, 2009
 Quasikristalle, novel, 2013
 Lieber aufgeregt als abgeklärt, essays, 2015
 Tiere für Fortgeschrittene, short stories, 2017
 Gedankenspiele über den Kompromiss, essay, 2020
 Geborgen am Busen der Musen. Früher oder später bekommt das Museum uns alle, essay, 2020
 Dunkelblum, novel, 2021

References

Sources

Further reading
 

1970 births
Living people
Austrian journalists
Austrian women writers